Gulyantsi (also transliterated Guljanci, Gulyanci, Guliantzi, Gulyantzi, etc.) is a town in central northern Bulgaria, part of Pleven Province. It is the administrative centre of Gulyantsi municipality and lies in the central north of the province, near the town of Nikopol, very close to the Danube River. As of December 2009, the town has a population of 3,432 inhabitants.

Gulyantsi lies 34 kilometres north of the provincial capital Pleven, 4 kilometres south of the Danube and 7-8 kilometres southwest of the mouth of the Iskar River at Gigen village. It was proclaimed a town on 4 September 1974.

References

External links
 Gulyantsi municipality website  

Towns in Bulgaria
Populated places in Pleven Province